Ganjabad (also Romanized as Ganjābād) is a village in Baqeran Rural District, in the Central District of Birjand County, South Khorasan Province, Iran. At the 2006 census, its population was 36, in 9 families.

References 

Populated places in Birjand County